Tangjiawan Station, formerly Jintang Station during planning, is an elevated station of the Guangzhou–Zhuhai intercity railway (Guangzhu ICR). It is located in Tangjia Town, Xiangzhou, Zhuhai, Guangdong, China, and is located directly in front of the Zhuhai College of the Beijing Institute of Technology and near the Zhuhai International Circuit.

The station entered service when all remaining stations in the Zhuhai section of the Guangzhu MRT opened on December 31, 2012.

References

Railway stations in Guangdong
Zhuhai
Railway stations in China opened in 2012